Belleair Beach is a city in Pinellas County, Florida, United States. The population was 1,560 at the 2010 census.

Geography

Government
The City of Belleair Beach operates under a Council-Manager form of government. The City Council is the legislative body of the city and is empowered by the charter to make policy which is then communicated to the City Manager for implementation. The City Council is composed of a mayor and six councilmembers who are elected at large on a non-partisan basis.

Demographics

As of the census of 2000, there were 1,751 people, 825 households, and 545 families residing in the city. The population density was 3,037.2 inhabitants per square mile (1,165.6/km2). The racial makeup of the city was 96.74% White, 0.23% African American, 0.17% Native American, 1.37% Asian, 0.11% Pacific Islander, 0.34% from other races, and 1.03% from two or more races. Hispanic or Latino of any race were 2.86% of the population.

There were 825 households, out of which 13.7% had children under the age of 18 living with them, 59.9% were married couples living together, 3.9% had a female householder with no husband present, and 33.9% were non-families. 26.4% of all households were made up of individuals, and 11.9% had someone living alone who was 65 years of age or older. The average household size was 2.12 and the average family size was 2.54.

In the city, the population was spread out, with 11.9% under the age of 18, 4.0% from 18 to 24, 20.0% from 25 to 44, 38.3% from 45 to 64, and 25.8% who were 65 years of age or older. The median age was 52 years. For every 100 females, there were 101.0 males. For every 100 females age 18 and over, there were 98.2 males.

The median income for a household in the city was $63,529, and the median income for a family was $90,282. Males had a median income of $56,354 versus $46,583 for females. The per capita income for the city was $61,569. About 4.0% of families and 7.8% of the population were below the poverty line, including 10.6% of those under age 18 and 2.4% of those age 65 or over.

References

External links

 City of Belleair Beach official website

Cities in Pinellas County, Florida
Cities in Florida
Populated coastal places in Florida on the Gulf of Mexico
Beaches of Pinellas County, Florida
Beaches of Florida
1950 establishments in Florida
Populated places established in 1950